Mez formerly known as King Mez (born Morris W. Ricks II) is an American rapper, producer, writer and director. He is perhaps best known for his work with Dr. Dre and on the 2019 rap album Revenge of the Dreamers III. He was born on a military base in Fort Campbell, KY and grew up in Southeast Raleigh, NC.

Musical career
The Los Angeles Times stated: "Mez has dropped a few acclaimed mixtapes including his most recent, "Long Live the King," but he most recently appeared on Dr. Dre's Compton, which arrive during "Darkside/Gone," "Satisfiction" and "Talk About It. He also wrote on 14 of the 16 songs. He is the majority writer after Dr. Dre himself." Mez has also collaborated with fellow North Carolinians J. Cole, Rapsody, and Drique London, as well as producers 9th Wonder and Khrysis in the past." Mez appeared on the song with Daniel Day on the Lecrae song "Lost My Way" on the Church Clothes 2 mixtape. His first official co-sign from Dr. Dre came about during the airing of 'The Pharmacy' on Beats 1, via a freestyle Mez rapped over a beat produced by Cardiak, with Dr. Dre on the ad-libs.

Discography
 The King's Khrysis EP  (2011)
 My Everlasting Zeal (2012)
 Long Live The King (2014)
 Data Plan .001 (2018)
 Data Plan .002 (2018)
 Data Plan .003 (2019)

Filmography

Music Videos 

 J.Cole - "a m a r i"
 J.Cole – "Middle Child"
Dreamville - "Sleep Deprived"
 Sir - "Mood"

References

Rappers from North Carolina
Musicians from Raleigh, North Carolina
1990 births
Living people
21st-century American rappers